The Constitutional Union Party was an Iraqi political party that was founded by Nuri Al-Said in 1949. The party included politicians from different ethnicities and religions, it was based in Baghdad with its headquarter located at Al-Rasheed street. The party held it first conference on 23 December 1949, the conference elected members for the party's Higher Commission, and Al-Said as a chairman.

The Higher Commission elected members of the Central Committee, 15 members were elected including: Nuri al-Said, Abdul Wahab Morgan, Shaker al-Wadi, Muhammad Ali Mahmoud, Mohammed Hassan Kubba, Jamil Abdul Wahab, Abdul Qader Bash Aayan, Jamil Al Urfali, Abdul Majeed Abbas, Azzedine Mulla, Saad Omar, Ahmed Al-Amir, Rasheed Al-Chalabi, Diaa Jafar and Khalil Kenah. The Central Committee elected Abdulwahab Morjan as vice president, Khalil Kenna as First Secretary, Ahmad Al Amer as Second Secretary, Jamil Al Urfa as Accountant and Mohammed Hassan Kabbah as Treasurer.

The party aimed to restrict crown prince Abd al-Ilah interventions in Iraqi politics, support Al-Said in government formation, and resist left-wing parties.

References

1949 establishments in Iraq
1954 disestablishments in Iraq
Anti-communist parties
Defunct political parties in Iraq
Organizations based in Baghdad
Political parties disestablished in 1954
Political parties established in 1949